The Hobbit is a pub in the Bevois Valley area of Southampton, England. Previously the Portswood Hotel, it was named after J. R. R. Tolkien's book The Hobbit in 1989. In 2012 the pub was involved in a legal dispute with Middle-earth Enterprises, a company owned by film producer Saul Zaentz, over its use of the name.

History and facilities
The Hobbit was originally known as the Portswood Hotel, and appears on 19th-century Ordnance Survey mapping. It was renamed The Hobbit in 1989. Its name is inspired by the race of the same name featured in the works of J. R. R. Tolkien; other public houses with the same name exist or have existed in Weston-super-Mare, Monyash (now renamed) and Sowerby Bridge. It won the Best Pub award at the Southern Daily Echo'''s "Best Bar None" event in 2007. In December 2007 it was forced to close for two weeks as a result of an administrative error, during which time the pub was refurbished.

In March 2003, The Hobbit was the last place murdered student Hannah Foster was seen alive. 

The Hobbit used to be known for cocktails and shots named after characters from Tolkien's novels The Hobbit and The Lord of the Rings'', but were issued a cease and desist letter from Middle-earth Enterprises in July 2020.

Ownership and management
The pub is one of several in Southampton to be owned by Punch Taverns. It was operated by landlord Steve Dockrell prior to his death in October 2008, and was taken over by Stella Roberts in June 2009. In the 2010s, the Hobbit's business began to suffer because of increasing costs, and that since the rise in tuition fees students have been spending much less at the venue. In September 2019, Jack Andrews took over as landlord.  

On 13 March 2012, it was reported that Middle-earth Enterprises, a division of the Saul Zaentz Company (SZC) which oversees copyright issues surrounding Tolkien's works on Middle earth, had accused the pub of copyright infringement over the use of the Hobbit name. The move was strongly criticised by actors Stephen Fry and Ian McKellen, both of whom were to appear in the Hobbit film series, and by John Denham, Member of Parliament for Southampton Itchen. A Facebook campaign to save The Hobbit was launched, and by 16 March 2012 had gained over 50,000 followers. On the same date SZC offered to resolve the dispute by allowing the pub to use the name for a licence fee. Fry and McKellen later offered to contribute to the payment of the licence fee. 

Despite the apparent resolution, legal disputes surrounding the issue continued into August 2012, when an event was held at the pub to raise money to pay for its lawyers to continue negotiations. In 2017, Roberts reported that the pub may have to close owing to increasing rates for commercial premises in Southampton. A crowdfunding appeal was set up to raise appropriate funds.

In 2021, the pub underwent a £600,000 revamp which involved renovating most of the building.

References

External links
Official site

Pubs in Southampton
Things named after Tolkien works